Ademar is a masculine Germanic name, ultimately derived from Audamar, as is the German form Otmar. It was in use in medieval France, Latinized as Adamarus, and in modern times has been popular in French, Spanish and Portuguese-speaking countries. A feminine form Adamardis seems to have been in use from the 10th century, reduced to Aanord, Aenor by the 12th.

Medieval:
 Ademar de Chabannes (d. 1034), French monk
 Ademar Jordan (d. 1212), French knight
 Guilhem Ademar (d. 1217), French troubadour
 Ademar lo Negre (d. 1219), French troubadour

Modern:
 Ademar Caballero (born 1918), Brazilian swimmer
 Ademar José Gevaerd (born 1952), Brazilian ufologist
 Ademar Benítez (born 1956), Uruguayan footballer
 Ademar Marques (born 1959), Portuguese footballer
 Ademar da Silva Braga Júnior (born 1976), Brazilian  footballer
 Ademar Rodríguez (born 1990), Mexican footballer
 Ademar Tavares Júnior (born 1980), Brazilian  footballer
 Ademar dos Santos Batista (born 1983), Brazilian  footballer
 Ademar Aparecido Xavier Júnior (born 1985), Brazilian  footballer

See also 
 CB Ademar León, Spanish handball team

References 

Germanic given names
French masculine given names
Brazilian given names
Portuguese masculine given names
Spanish masculine given names